Carlos Fernando García Coronado (born 10 September 1997) is a Mexican professional footballer who plays for UAZ.

External links
 
 

1997 births
Living people
People from Delicias, Chihuahua
Footballers from Chihuahua
Association football defenders
Leones Negros UdeG footballers
Atlético Reynosa footballers
Ascenso MX players
Liga Premier de México players
Tercera División de México players
Mexican footballers